Bradford Downtown Historic District, is a national historic district in Bradford, McKean County, Pennsylvania, United States. It includes 136 contributing structures, mostly commercial buildings, and three structures otherwise listed on the National Register; Bradford Armory, Bradford Old City Hall, and the Rufus Barrett Stone House.

It was listed on the National Register of Historic Places in 2000.

References

See also 
 National Register of Historic Places listings in McKean County, Pennsylvania

Italianate architecture in Pennsylvania
Geography of McKean County, Pennsylvania
Historic districts on the National Register of Historic Places in Pennsylvania
National Register of Historic Places in McKean County, Pennsylvania